This is a list of election results for the electoral district of Gouger in South Australian elections.

Members for Gouger

Russack went to represent the Electoral district of Goyder from September 1977.

Election results

Elections in the 1970s

Elections in the 1960s

Elections in the 1950s

 Preferences were not distributed.

Elections in the 1940s

Elections in the 1930s

References

South Australian state electoral results by district